Yelena Sinitsina (born 4 October 1971) is a Kazakhstani short track speed skater. She competed in two events at the 1994 Winter Olympics.

References

External links
 

1971 births
Living people
Kazakhstani female short track speed skaters
Olympic short track speed skaters of Kazakhstan
Short track speed skaters at the 1994 Winter Olympics
Place of birth missing (living people)
20th-century Kazakhstani women